I-369 was an Imperial Japanese Navy Type D1 transport submarine. Completed and commissioned in October 1944, she served in World War II and conducted transport missions between Japan and outlying islands. The last Japanese transport submarine to visit the Japanese base at Truk, she surrendered at the end of the war and was scrapped in 1946.

Construction and commissioning

I-369 was laid down on 1 September 1943 by the Yokosuka Navy Yard at Yokosuka, Japan, with the name Submarine No. 5469. She was renamed  on 25 January 1944 and provisionally attached to the Sasebo Naval District that day. She was launched on 9 March 1944 and completed and commissioned on 9 October 1944.

Service history

Upon commissioning, I-369 was attached formally to the Yokosuka Naval District and was assigned to Submarine Squadron 11 for workups. With her workups complete, she was reassigned to Submarine Squadron 7 on 15 December 1944.

On 21 January 1945, I-369 departed Yokosuka bound for Marcus Island on her first transport mission. She arrived at Marcus on 28 January 1945, unloaded her cargo, and got back underway to return to Yokosuka, which she reached on 5 February 1945. She again left Yokosuka on 12 February for her second supply voyage. After delivering her cargo at Chichijima in the Bonin Islands, she returned to Yokosuka on 21 February 1945.

I-369 got underway from Yokosuka on 16 April for her third and final transport voyage, this time setting course for Truk and Mereyon Island at Woleai in the Caroline Islands. The last Japanese transport submarine to visit Truk, she arrived there on 1 May 1945 and unloaded 0.312 metric tons of food, 6.303 metric tons of weapons and ammunition, 25 metric tons of fuel, and 4.4 metric tons of other cargo. Departing Truk on 3 May 1945, she proceeded to Mereyon, where she arrived after dark on 7 May 1945 and unloaded 38.9 metric tons of food and 2.6 metric tons of other cargo. She also embarked two boxes of the cremated remains of deceased Japanese military personnel and 60 passengers, including the surviving crew members of an 801st Naval Air Group Kawanishi H8K (Allied reporting name "Emily") flying boat which had landed there after serving as a pathfinder aircraft for Operation Tan No. 2, an 11 March 1945 Japanese kamikaze attack against the American fleet anchorage at Ulithi Atoll. She departed Mereyon on 11 May 1945 and completed her voyage with her arrival at Yokosuka on 24 May 1945.

On 25 May 1945, I-369 began conversion at Yokosuka into a tanker submarine capable of carrying 100 metric ton of aviation gasoline. She was still under conversion and in a partially dismantled state when hostilities between Japan and the Allies ended on 15 August 1945. She surrendered to the Allies on 30 August 1945.

Disposal
The Japanese struck I-369 from the Navy list on 15 September 1945. She was scrapped at Yokosuka in 1946.

Notes

Sources
 Hackett, Bob & Kingsepp, Sander.  IJN Submarine I-369: Tabular Record of Movement.  Retrieved on September 19, 2020.

Type D submarines
Ships built by Yokosuka Naval Arsenal
1944 ships
World War II submarines of Japan